Peter Famiyeh Bozah (born 11 September 1994), known by the stage name Fameye, is a Ghanaian rapper and musician from Bogoso. He is best known for his single  "Nothing I Get". He released a remix of the song which featured Article Wan, Medikal and Kuami Eugene. He was a member of MTN Hitmaker Season 3. He won an award for the best new artist of the year at the 2020 VGMA's.

Early life and education 
Fameye was born in Accra but hails from Bogoso, in the Western Region of Ghana. He attended Odorgonno Senior High School and completed in the year 2013. He was formally a rapper in his high school days before switching to the Afro beat genre.

Discography

Awards

References 

Ghanaian rappers
Ghanaian musicians
Living people
1994 births